Ikot Abasi is located in the south west corner of Akwa Ibom State, Nigeria. It is bounded by Oruk Anam Local Government Area in the north, Mkpat Enin and Eastern Obolo Local Government Areas in the east and the Atlantic Ocean in the south. The Imo River forms the natural boundary in the west separating it from Rivers State.

People 
The people of Ikot Abasi are made up of the Ibibio ethnic group with diverse cultural heritage and tradition. They speak the Ibibio language.

Ikot Abasi is made up of five clans namely: Ikpa Edemaya Clan, Ikpa Ibekwe Clan, Ikpa Nnung Assang Clan, Ukpum Ette Clan and Ukpum Okon Clan.

Edemaya 

It has three political wards which together comprise twenty-three (23) villages namely;

 Atan Eka Iko
 Atan Ikpe
 Ediduo
 Iboro
 Ikot Aboa Nd
 Ikot Akpabo
 Ikot Akpan
 Ikot Efre
 Ikot Eneni
 Ikot Etenge Ndom
 Ikot Eyen Imo
 Ikot Ikara
 Ikot Iyire
 Ikot Ndien
 Ikot Obio Akpan
 Ikot Obio Ekpe
 Ikot Oboro Enyin
 Ikot Okpok
 Ikot Ubo Akama
 Ikot Ufot
 Ikot Unya
 Ikot Uso Ide
 Ukan

Towns in Ikpa Ibekwe

 Ata Udo-Usung
 Ikot Aba
 Ikot Abasi
 Ikot Akpan-Ata 
 Ikot Essien
 Ikot Etetuk
 Ikot Obong
 Ikot Ukpo-Inua
 Ikpetim and
 Uta Ewa

History 
Because of its location at the break in the mangrove swamp and rain forest of the eastern Niger River delta, it was a collecting point for slaves in the 19th century. In 1870, Jubo Juboha came to Ikot Abasi and founded the kingdom of Opobo. He was a former Igbo (Ibo) slave.

Ikot Abasi, a community in then Calabar Province, for good reasons.
Although Ikot Abasi, formerly part of the famed Opobo Kingdom, was already on the world map before 1929, the women's uprising against Nigeria's colonial rulers in 1929 was to provide a further push into prominence for this town, then already popular as the site of a famous boat yard, seat of a British consulate and part of the late King Jaja's area.

Three-quarters of a century ago, Ikot Abasi was one of a number of towns in both Calabar and Owerri provinces, whose women bravely took exception to what they considered exploitative excesses of the British rulers of the then non-independent Nigeria.

In 1995, the year of that famed Beijing conference, the National Gallery of Modern Art, Lagos (NGA) put out a very important book, The women's revolt of 1929. The book, which features contributions from notable academics like Prof. Monday E. Noah, Prof. Obaro Ikime and Chief N.U. Akpan, among others, reminds that one of the women killed by the colonial forces during the 1929 protest was the mother of a boy, Egbert. That lad would later grow into a famous jurist and administrator (Justice Egbert Udo Udoma).
Such was the impact of the reforms that trailed the woman's protest that the March 8, 1933 issue of the Daily Times described the changes as "the great charter of liberty for the people". But the prize did not come easy. Prof. M. E. Ekpo, another of the book's contributors, revealed that in the Calabar Province alone, more than 53 people were killed beside over 50 others injured.

Launched in 1989, in commemoration of the 60th anniversary of the uprising, The women's revolt of 1929 is an anthology of select papers from a national symposium on the subject, which took place in Port-Harcourt in 1982. According to Dr Paul Chike Dike, editor of the anthology, "An attempt by the (protesting) women to move nearer the colonial troops led to the order to shoot, in which over 24 women were killed".

Geography 
Until the 1970s, the ancient Opobo Kingdom was part of then South Eastern State (later re-Christened Cross River). However, a boundary adjustment exercise split Opobo. Opobo Island was made part of Rivers State while the mainland part remained within Cross River. That area, renamed Ikot Abasi, now lies in present-day Akwa Ibom State. Sources say ancient Ikot Abasi referred to smaller settlement but the name has assumed a more or less generic dimension in recent times. In the larger sense, today's Ikot Abasi comprises five clans: Ikpa-Ibekwe, Ukpum-Ette, Ukpum-Okon, Edem-Aya and Ikpa Nnung Asang. The palace of the paramount ruler of Ikot Abasi is within Ukpum okon clan .

Ikot Abasi once hosted a British Consulate, which is how one of the major streets here, Consulate Road, came by its name. At the roundabout leading to Consulate Road, the tourist would notice a statue of the late Justice Udo Udo Udoma, the first Nigerian to bag a Doctor of Philosophy (PhD) in law. The deceased legend's other achievements included his appointment as Chairman, Constituent Assembly (1977–1979), Chief Justice of Uganda (1963–1969) and Governor-General of that African Great Lakes country in 1963. Sauntering down Consulate Road, the wayfarer is likely to find one or two decent eateries not long after walking past Beracah Chambers, a law office. Further down this road, stands the Local Government Secretariat.

Overlooking the river, which separates Ikot Abasi from Opobo Island, are a number of quaint bungalows. One or two of these blocks serve as offices of the Ikot Abasi Traditional Rulers Council. Opposite these chiefs' secretariat, across a narrow asphalt lane, is a monument that was unveiled on December 16, 1985 by Justice Udoma. The spot, where the sculpture has been installed, is believed to be the place that some of the brave women were martyred in 1929.

Tourism 
The area is dotted with tourist attraction centres. Her beautiful beach front at Uta Ewa, the Berger Jetty along Uta Ewa creek and the coastline create attractive tourist resorts.

Natural resources 
The abundant gas and oil deposits have attracted many establishments to the area. 
The oil fields include Utapate (onshore). Adna (offshore) and Asabo (offshore).

Agricultural resources 
Arable agricultural produce include cassava, yam, sweet yam, taro and maize while cash crops are not limited to oil palm, coconut, raffia, rubber and palm kernel. There is abundant forest reserve for timber and wild life while commercial fishing thrives in the area. Although known for boat-building, a sand bar partially blocks the entrance to its port from the Gulf of Guinea. Ikot Abasi is also a home to Alscon, the biggest aluminium smelter plant in Africa.

References

Local Government Areas in Akwa Ibom State